Timur Viktorovich Bitokov (born 13 March 1984) is a former Russian professional footballer.

Club career
He made his professional debut in the Russian First Division in 2004 for PFC Spartak Nalchik.

External links

References

1984 births
Sportspeople from Nalchik
Living people
Russian footballers
Association football defenders
FC Lokomotiv Moscow players
PFC Spartak Nalchik players
PFC Krylia Sovetov Samara players
Russian Premier League players